Defluviicoccus is a genus in the phylum Pseudomonadota (Bacteria).

Etymology
The name Defluviicoccus derives from:Latin noun defluvium, sewage;  and coccus (from Greek kokkos (κόκκος), grain, seed), coccus; Defluviicoccus, a coccus from sewage.

Species
The genus contains a single valid species, namely D. vanus (corrig. Maszenan et al. 2005,  (type species of the genus).; Latin  vanus, empty, idle, referring to its staining behaviour.)

See also
 Bacterial taxonomy
 Microbiology

References 

Bacteria genera
Rhodospirillales
Monotypic bacteria genera